Enolmis is a genus of moths in the family Scythrididae.

Species
Some species of this genus are:
 Enolmis abenhumeya (Agenjo, 1951) (from Spain)
 Enolmis acanthella (Godart, 1824) (Mediterranean)
 Enolmis agenjoi Passerin d'Entrèves, 1988 (from Southern Europe)
 Enolmis amseli Passerin d'Entrèves, 1997 (from Morocco)
 Enolmis arabica Passerin d'Entrèves, 1986
 Enolmis bimerdella (Staudinger, 1859) (from Spain)
 Enolmis delicatella (Rebel, 1901) (Iberian peninsula)
 Enolmis delnoydella Groenen & Schreurs, 2016
 Enolmis desidella (Lederer, 1855) (Mediterranean)
 Enolmis gigantella (Lucas, 1942) (from Morocco)
 Enolmis nevadensis Passerin d'Entrèves, 1997 (from Spain)
 Enolmis saudita Passerin d'Entrèves, 1986
 Enolmis seeboldiella (Agenjo, 1951) (from Spain)
 Enolmis sierraenevadae Passerin d'Entrèves, 1997 (from Spain)
 Enolmis tunisiae Bengtsson, 2005
 Enolmis userai Agenjo, 1962 (from Spain)
 Enolmis vivesi Bengtsson & Passerin d'Entrèves, 1988 (from Spain)

Former species
 Enolmis jemenensis Bengtsson, 2002

References

Scythrididae